Stone Tavern at Roney's Point is a historic inn and tavern complex located at Roney's Point, Ohio County, West Virginia. It includes an early 19th-century stone tavern and early 20th-century auto camp.  The tavern is Federal in style, having an I house form, with later Italianate details added in the 1870s.  It is built of sandstone and a two-story brick wing was added in the 1920s.  The auto court, known as the Stone House Auto Court, was built in 1922.  The remaining building is one story, with 10 units and a lower level garage.  It is built of square tile block and coated in stucco.

It was listed on the National Register of Historic Places in 1993.

References

Hotel buildings on the National Register of Historic Places in West Virginia
Federal architecture in West Virginia
Colonial Revival architecture in West Virginia
Hotel buildings completed in 1922
Buildings and structures in Ohio County, West Virginia
National Register of Historic Places in Ohio County, West Virginia
Italianate architecture in West Virginia
I-house architecture in West Virginia
Stone houses in West Virginia